or "Outer Nothingness School" is a Japanese koryū martial art school founded by  on 23 June 1680. Its formal name is Mugai Shinden Kenpō (無外真伝剣法).

History 

The founder of Mugai-ryū, Tsuji Gettan Sukemochi (辻月丹資茂) was born to Tsuji Yadayū descendant of Sasaki Shirō Tadatsuna, in the first year of Keian (1648, early Edo period),
in the Masugi (馬杉) village area  of Miyamura (宮村), in Kōga (甲賀郡) region  of Ōmi (近江), now Shiga Prefecture.

When he was 13 he went to Kyoto to study swordsmanship and at the age of 26 he received kaiden (full transmission) and opened a school in Edo (now Tokyo). The school he studied is controversial. The most accepted theory is that he learned Yamaguchi-ryū  swordsmanship under Yamaguchi Bokushinsai, but earlier documents state he studied under Itō Taizen.

Also, he studied Zen Buddhism and Classical Chinese literature under Zen monks Sekitan Ryōzen (石潭良全) and Shinshū (神州) at Kyūkōji temple (吸江寺) in Azabu Sakurada-chō (麻布桜田町). At the age of 32 he reached enlightenment and received from his Zen teacher a formal poem taken from the Buddhist scriptures as an acknowledgment and proof of his accomplishment. Tsuji Gettan Sukemochi used the word Mugai from this poem as his nom de plume and hence, later generations alluded to his swordsmanship teachings as being "the style of (Tsuji) Mugai", or Mugai-ryū.

The name "Mugai" comes from the following poem:

The earlier documents on the school opened by Tsuji Gettan were lost in 1695, when a great fire hit Edo. Later records show that he had 32 daimyō  as pupils, including the rōjū  Ogasawara Sado-no-kami Nagashige,  Sakai Kageyu Tadataka, the feudal lord of Maebashi, and Yamauchi Toyomasa, the feudal lord of Tosa. The list also included 150 jikisan, and 932 baishin.

Tsuji Gettan Sukemochi was known not just as a master of the sword, but as an enlightened Zen philosopher and scholar. As an evidence, his writing Mugai Shinden Kenpō Ketsu shows heavy influences from Zen and Chinese philosophy.

He died on June 23 in the 12th year of Kyōhō 享保 (1725) at the age of 79. The tombs of Tsuji Gettan Sukemochi's successors are kept at the Nyoraiji temple (如来寺), which is now in Nishiōi (西大井町), Shinagawa (品川区), Tokyo.

Tsuji Gettan Sukemochi was unmarried and it is assumed that he had no offspring as he adopted the eldest son of priest Sawatari Bungo-no-kami (猿渡豊後守), of Ōkunitama Shrine (大国魂神社) in what is now known as the Tokyo provincial government area, as his son. Sawatari's eldest son took the name Tsuji Kimata Sukehide (都治記摩多資英) and became one of Tsuji Gettan's successors, along with Gettan's nephew, Tsuji Uheita (辻右平太).

Tsuji's school spread mainly in four domains: Himeji (now a city in Hyogo Prefecture), Isezaki (now part of Gunma Prefecture), Koromo (now Toyota city of Aichi Prefecture) and Tosa (now Kochi Prefecture).

In the Meiji Era, two of the most famous swordsmen in Japan were from Mugai-ryū, both being appointed as Hanshi by Dai Nippon Butokukai: Takahashi Kyūtarō (1859-1940) from Himeji and Kawasaki Zensaburō (1860-1944) from Tosa. The lineage of Takahashi Kyūtarō was kept by his grandson, Takahashi Hidezō, Hanshi of Zen Nihon Kendō Renmei.

Mugai Shinden Kenpō Curriculum 

The school has only kenjutsu in its curriculum, having adopted the Jikyō-ryū (自鏡流) school of iaijutsu as a complement, and it has a strong connection with Zen due to Gettan's belief that the "sword and Zen are the way of the same Truth".

The curriculum of Mugai-ryū consists of 10 techniques with a long sword and 3 techniques with a short sword. Later, the techniques for duels (shiaiguchi 試合口) were also added.

An analysis of the techniques present in Mugai-ryū shows a clear influence of Ittō-ryū, so either the Yamaguchi-ryū studied by Tsuji was a derivation of Ittō-ryū, or Itō Taizen was a master of this style.

The scarce number of techniques in Mugai-ryū reflects Tsuji Gettan's philosophy on the actual effectiveness of techniques, as well as his methods of teaching and grading.

About Jikyō-ryū iaijutsu 

Jikyō-ryu (自鏡流) is a school of iaijutsu founded by Taga Jikyōken Morimasa (多賀自鏡軒盛政), being a derivation of the Shin Tamiya-ryū (新田宮流) school. Taga is said to have taught iaijutsu to Tsuji Gettan while in Edo. The Takahashi lineage of Mugai-ryū kenjutsu learned iai from the Yamamura lineage of Jikyō-ryū, generation after generation.

Jikyō-ryū's base curriculum features two sections, which comprises two sets each. They are, in order: Goka 五箇 (5 techniques), Kumiai 組合 (15 techniques), Goyō 五用 (7 techniques) and Naiden 内伝 (14 techniques). After those, there is a further "set", taught only to the most advanced students.

Although this school is usually known as being associated to the Mugai-ryū, it is a school on its own. Its most famous lineage is the Yamamura lineage, but there are other lesser known lineages.

About Mugai-ryū Iai Hyōdō 

Mugai-ryū Iai Hyōdō (Mugai Shinden Iai Hyōdō 無外真伝居合兵道) is a modern school of iaido founded by Nakagawa Shiryō Shinichi (中川士龍申一, 1895–1981). 
Nakagawa was, in his youth, a kendo disciple of Takahashi Kyutarō, but he chose to focus on the iaijutsu techniques that Takahashi knew. Based on those, Nakagawa created Mugai-ryū Iai Hyōdō.

Nakagawa's lineage was formally passed to Ishii Gogetsu Zenzō (石井悟月善蔵) in the late 1950s. However, this seems to be revoked by Nakagawa himself later on.

Today Mugai-ryū has splintered into several lines and there is no one sōke(representative). Nakagawa Shiryō Shinichi is generally considered the last sōke. He did not appoint a successor, but awarded several menkyo kaiden (full transmission), and his students continue to teach the school and several new lines have been established, each with their own sōke. Nakagawa also founded an organization called Mugai Kai to help preserve the school.

Although there are some minor variations according to the lineage, the base curriculum of the school can be considered as follows:

Apart from these, there is a set called Naiden (内伝), taught only for the advanced students.

The differences between Mugai-ryū Kenjutsu, Jikyō-ryū Iaijutsu and Mugai-ryū Iai Hyōdō 

Mugai-ryū Kenjutsu, Jikyō-ryū Iaijutsu and Mugai-ryū Iai Hyōdō are three separate entities, being distinct from each other.

Mugai-ryū kenjutsu (Mugai Shinden Kenpō) is a school of kenjutsu whose practitioners also studied Jikyō-ryū iaijutsu. Mugai-ryū Iai Hyōdō (Mugai Shinden Iai Hyōdō) is a gendai budo (modern school) of iaido, being named after the kenjutsu school due to the fact that Nakagawa Shinichi's kendo teacher was from Mugai-ryū kenjutsu.

Although the lore in Mugai-ryu Iai Hyōdō traditionally places its founder as Tsuji Gettan Sukemochi, this is historically inaccurate. Nakagawa himself states several times that "Mugai-ryū is actually Jikyō-ryū", hence the Mugai Shinden Iai Hyōdō must be seen as a different school from the Mugai Shinden Kenpō, which is a school of kenjutsu.

However, while it can be said that Mugai-ryū Iai Hyōdō was created based on some of the Jikyō-ryū techniques, making several techniques visually similar, both schools are completely different. This can be seen in the actual techniques, as well as their uses, interpretations and variations, and in other teachings.

For instance, a glance at the names of the techniques shows that Mugai-ryū Iai Hyōdō altered the order of the curriculum, removed and rearranged several Jikyō-ryū techniques and added new ones.

The following table maps some of the Mugai-ryū Iai Hyōdō techniques' names to the original Jikyō-ryū curriculum:

Notes on differences 

 Although they may share the same name, the actual technique from Jikyō-ryū may differ in its entirety from the Mugai-ryu homonymous.
 There is no set called Go-ō 五応 in Jikyō-ryū.
 The Mugai-ryū's Hashiri-gakari (走り掛り), Iai no kata (kumitachi)(居合之形) and the Wakizashi no kata (脇差之形) sets do not exist in Jikyō-ryū and neither do they have any homonymous technique in the Jikyō-ryū curriculum.
 There are other sets in Jikyō-ryū that are not present in Mugai-ryū Iai Hyōdō.

Also, although Nakagawa had access to several Jikyō-ryū's densho (scrolls and manuscripts), he was not fully instructed in them. This is apparent in his explanation of the densho called Yōhō(Mochiikata) Nijūgoka-ji(Nijūgoka no koto) (用方二十五箇事), where he admits his ignorance about the concept of "misumi" (三角), for instance. Other evidences of his incomplete instruction can be seen in his explanation on the length of the sword and on the sageo(下緒), both lacking crucial information for a true Jikyō-ryū practitioner, among other teachings and oral instructions that are not seen in Mugai-ryū Iai Hyōdō.

The grading system used in Mugai-ryū Iai Hyōdō is based on the modern dan/kyū systems of modern martial arts like judo and kendo. Jikyō-ryū and Mugai Shinden Kenpō employ an older grading system, used during the Tokugawa Shogunate.

Notes

References

External links 

 latest research developments on Mugai ryu and Tsuji Gettan
 Nippon Iaido Renmei Kishiwada Shibu homepage
 Nippon Iaido Renmei Chicago Shibu Homepage
 Isoukai Homepage

Ko-ryū bujutsu
Japanese martial arts